ABC Rochester may refer to:

WHAM-TV in Rochester, New York
KAAL (TV) in Rochester, Minnesota